Sport Toplumy Stadium is a multi-purpose stadium in Balkanabat, Turkmenistan. It is currently used mostly for football matches and serves as the home for Balkan FK.  The stadium holds 10,000 people.

History 
The sports complex opened on 14 October 2009. Construction works carried out by Turkish company Ozaylar. The project cost $20 million.

The sports complex includes a stadium for 10,000 spectators, sports facilities for volleyball, basketball, boxing, wrestling, mini-football, tennis. There is a fitness center with gym, swimming pool, a small hotel with 50 rooms.

References

External links 
Stadium picture
Video

Football venues in Turkmenistan
Multi-purpose stadiums in Turkmenistan